Atilla is a variant spelling of Attila, ruler of the Huns from 434 to 453.

Atilla may also refer to:
Atilla (clothing), a Hungarian shell-jacket or short coat
Operation Atilla, a Turkish Armed Forces invasion in response to the 1974 Cypriot coup d'état

People with the surname 
Can Atilla (born 1969), Turkish composer and musician

People with the given name 
Atilla Altıkat (died 1982), Turkish military attaché to Ottawa, Canada
Atilla Birlik (born 1977), Turkish German footballer
Atilla Engin (born 1946), Turkish American fusion jazz musician
Atilla Iskifoglu, Turkish world champion flair bartender
Atilla Karaosmanoğlu (1932–2013), Turkish economist and politician
Atilla Koç (born 1946), Turkish politician of the Justice and Development Party
Atilla Koca (born 1980), Turkish professional footballer
Atilla Kuzu (born 1963), Turkish designer
Atilla Manizade (born in Cyprus, 1945–2016), Turkish Cypriot opera singer
Atilla Özmen (born 1988), Turkish footballer
Atilla Taş (born 1975), Turkish singer
Atilla Yayla (born 1957), Turkish political thinker
Atilla Yildirim (born 1990), Dutch professional footballer
Atilla Şereftuğ (born 1950), Turkish Swiss songwriter

See also
Atila (disambiguation)
Attila (disambiguation)
Attila (name)